Statistics of Swiss Super League in the 1970–71 season.

Overview
14 teams contested in the 1970–71 Nationalliga A. These were the top 12 teams from the previous 1969–70 season and the two newly promoted teams Sion and Luzern. The championship was played in a double round robin. The champions would qualify for the 1971–72 European Cup and the last two teams in the league table at the end of the season were to be relegated. FC Basel finished the regular season level on points with Grasshopper Club Zürich and so these two teams had to contest a play-off game on 8 June 1971 to decide the title winners. Grasshopper won the play-off 4–3 after extra time. Bellinzona finished last and the table and were relegated. Sion and Fribourg, level on points, were both second last and thus they had to have a play-off against relegation. Sion won 1–0, so Fribourg were relegated.

League standings

Results

Championship play-off

Relegation play-off

References

Sources
Switzerland 1970–71 at RSSSF

Swiss Football League seasons
Swiss
1970–71 in Swiss football